Ayman Mohamed Abdelaziz (born 20 November 1978) is an Egyptian retired footballer who played as a midfielder. He had been out of Egypt for a very long time, after playing most of his career in Turkey.

He has Turkish citizenship after long time spent in Turkey with the name Ayman Aziz.

Balili incident
On August 12, 2007, Ayman viciously tackled Sivasspor's Israeli striker Pini Balili. Allegedly, Ayman swore at Balili in Arabic before the tackle and it caused the Sivasspor players to fight with the Trabzonspor players. A spectator then jumped onto the pitch and threw punches. Sivasspor players responded and after that Trabzonspor supporters raided the pitch and the match was stopped.

Coaching career

Misr Lel Makkasa SC
On February 2, 2020, he joint Misr Lel Makkasa SC as assistant manager, he left the club On 1 March 2020.

Honours
 Kocaelispor
Turkish Cup (1): 2002

References

External links
Ayman Abdel-Aziz at Footballdatabase

1978 births
Living people
Turkish footballers
Egyptian footballers
People from Sharqia Governorate
Egypt international footballers
Zamalek SC players
Gençlerbirliği S.K. footballers
Kocaelispor footballers
Trabzonspor footballers
Konyaspor footballers
Malatyaspor footballers
Çaykur Rizespor footballers
Egyptian expatriate footballers
Egyptian expatriate sportspeople in Turkey
Expatriate footballers in Turkey
Egyptian expatriate sportspeople in Saudi Arabia
Expatriate footballers in Saudi Arabia
2000 African Cup of Nations players
Süper Lig players
Turkish people of Egyptian descent
Naturalized citizens of Turkey
Hajer FC players
Egyptian Premier League players
Saudi Professional League players
Association football midfielders